Elizabeth Berridge (born May 2, 1962) is an American film and theatre actress. She is best known for playing Charlotte, the maid in The Powers that Be and Constanze Mozart in the Academy Award-winning 1984 film Amadeus. She also played the role of Officer Eve Eggers on The John Larroquette Show (1993–1996), and has  performed in the theater.

Early life and education
Berridge was born in New Rochelle, New York, the daughter of George Berridge, a lawyer, and Mary L. Berridge (née Robinson), a social worker. The family settled in Larchmont, New York, where she attended Chatsworth Elementary School. There she began to perform and sing. Due to her acting commitments, she earned her diploma through an independent-study program at Mamaroneck High School.

Career
Berridge was called in to audition for the part of Constanze Mozart after filming had already commenced in Prague on Amadeus. Meg Tilly, who was originally given the  role, injured her leg in a soccer game and had to withdraw from the film. Two actresses were flown to Prague, and after a week's auditions Berridge was given the part (supposedly because the other actress, Diane Franklin, was "too pretty" to play the part of a landlady's daughter).  Berridge and the other cast members remained in Prague for six months to complete the filming.

Personal life
In 2001, Berridge married actor Kevin Corrigan, whom she met on the set of the independent film Broke Even. They have a daughter, Sadie Rose Corrigan.

Filmography

Film

Television

References

External links

American film actresses
American television actresses
Lee Strasberg Theatre and Film Institute alumni
Actresses from New Rochelle, New York
1962 births
Living people
People from Larchmont, New York
21st-century American women